Dominopol is a defunct village located in the present-day area of Volodymyr-Volynskyi Raion of Volyn Oblast in Ukraine. On July 11, 1943, at the height of the Massacres of Poles in Volhynia, the village was attacked by a death squad of Ukrainian Insurgent Army aided by the Ukrainian peasants, and all ethnic Poles regardless of age and gender were tortured and murdered. Before World War II, Dominopol was a village in the Eastern regions of the Second Polish Republic, located in the Gmina Werba, Powiat Włodzimierz of the Wołyń Voivodeship. The area was invaded by the Soviet Union in 1939 and during Operation Barbarossa annexed by Nazi Germany into Reichskommissariat Ukraine in 1941.

The massacre
The politics Poland pursued during 1920 to 1939 towards locals, by destroying Ukrainian churches, promoting Polish language politics and giving land to Polish peasants, so that the local people had to scrum to survive.

The Dominopol massacre was unique in that it was preceded by the forest execution of several dozen young Polish partisans (15 to 20-years-old) trained by the former Polish Army officers including Stanisław Dąbrowski, who were tricked into believing in the joint Polish-Ukrainian resistance under the umbrella of the Ukrainian Insurgent Army (UPA). Most civilian victims in Dominopol were killed by axes and knives. Their number remains the subject of debate. Some sources estimate that approximately 60 Polish families have been murdered in the village by the Ukrainian nationalists, which is around 490 people including children. Other sources put the number of victims at 220–250 based on existing documentation. Afterwards, possessions of murdered Poles were looted by Ukrainian peasants who also participated in the massacre, and the village was burned.

In 2002, due to efforts of Association of Poles Murdered in the East from Zamość, a commemorative cross was erected where once Dominopol was.

See also
 Massacres of Poles in Volhynia and Eastern Galicia

References

1943 crimes in Poland
Massacres in 1943
World War II crimes in Poland
Massacres in Ukraine
Massacres of Poles in Volhynia
War crimes committed by the Ukrainian Insurgent Army
July 1943 events

pl:Zbrodnie w Dominopolu